Princess Flavia is a 1925 operetta in three acts based on Anthony Hope's novel The Prisoner of Zenda, with book and lyrics by Harry B. Smith and music by Sigmund Romberg.

Production
Princess Flavia was staged by J. C. Huffman
and produced by Lee Shubert and J. J. Shubert. The Broadway show opened November 2, 1925, at the Century Theatre. On February 1, 1926, it moved to the Shubert Theatre, continuing for a total run of 152 performances. The large cast was led by Harry Welchman, a popular tenor of the London stage, and soprano Evelyn Herbert in her first starring role.

Cast

 Harry Welchman as Rudolf Rassendyl and Rudolph, Crown Prince of Ruritania
 William Pringle as General Sapt
 John Clarke as Rupert of Hentzau
 William Danforth as Franz Teppich
 James Marshall as Lieut. Fritz van Tarlenheim
 Alois Havrilla as Gilbert Bertrand
 Douglass Dumbrille as Michael
 Evelyn Herbert as Princess Flavia
 Margaret Breen as Helga
 Felicia Drenova as Antoinette de Mauban
 Maude Odell as Sophie
 Dudley Marwick as Lackey
 Edmund Ruffner as Marshal Momsen
 Joseph Calleia as Senor Poncho
 Earle Lee as Lord Topham
 Stella Shiel as Princess Edelstein
 Dudley Marwick as Innkeeper
 Alois Havrilla as Josef
 Donald Lee as Cardinal

Songs

Act I
 Yes or No
 On Comrades
 Marionettes
 What Care I?
 Convent Bells are Ringing
 I Dare Not Love You
 By This Token

Act II
 Dance With Me
 Twilight Voices
 Only One

Act III
 I Love Them All
 In Ruritania

Reception
The New York Times review of the premiere of Princess Flavia described the show as "beautiful, tuneful, majestic and splendid in all its appointments."
Last night's audience, a gathering of habitual theatregoers who have known the splendors of The Student Prince and Rose-Marie and The Love Song during recent months, was forced to pay homage repeatedly throughout the evening to the even greater lavishness … and the stirring choruses evoked prolonged ovations at the end of each act.

Particular praise was accorded the performances of Welchman, Herbert, Dumbrille and the large chorus, as well as the sets by Watson Barratt.

References

External links
 

1925 musicals
Broadway musicals
Musicals based on novels
Musicals by Sigmund Romberg